Bihanga is a settlement in Ibanda District in the Western Region of Uganda. It is the location of the headquarters of Bihanga Parish, Nyamarebe sub-county.

Location

The geographical coordinates of Bihanga are:0°04'40.0"N, 30°36'35.0"E (latitude:0.077778; longitude:30.609722).

Overview
Bihanga lies on the old, dysfunctional metre-gauge railway, from Kampala to Kasese, that was built by the British colonialists in the 1950s. The location is also on the plans for the planned Uganda Standard Gauge Railway (Uganda SGR). The Kampala–Mpondwe Section or the Western Line of the Uganda SGR, intersects with the Bihanga–Mirama Hills Section or the Southwestern Line of the Uganda SGR, at Bihanga.

Bihanga is also the location of Bihanga Military Training School, one of the military schools in Uganda, owned and operated by the Uganda People's Defense Force.

The town is served by Rwamwanja Health Centre III, administered by the Ibanda District Administration.

Other points of interest nearby, include: (a) Katonga Wildlife Reserve and (b) Katonga River, as it flows westwards from the game reserve into Lake George.

As part of Bihanga Military Training School (Bihanga Training Camp), the European Union built Bihanga Airfield, a combined military and civilian airstrip for use by the military and by local administrators. The airstrip can be clearly seen on this map, south of the red arrow.

See also
 Kamwenge
 Kiruhura

References

External links
 Webpage of Ibanda District
 The Ceremony of the Change of the Bihanga Training Camp (BTC) Commander, on 30 August 2013, in Bihanga, Ibanda District, Uganda

Ibanda District
Populated places in Western Region, Uganda
Cities in the Great Rift Valley